Hydropark, or Hidropark (from ) is a landscape-recreational park on the Dnieper River in Kyiv, Ukraine.

History 

It was created as an entertainment complex with mainly water activities: beaches, boating, water attractions. It is located on Venetian and Dolobetsk islands; the Venetian Bridge connects these islands. Venetian island is connected with the rest of Kyiv by two bridges: the Metro Bridge to the right-bank city and the Rusanivka bridge to the left-bank city. The Hydropark station of Kyiv Metro is located on Venetian island.

Current activities available: number of beaches (including one for children and one for nudes), boat and catamarans rental, ping-pong and tennis, paintball and football, water attractions, restaurants, casino and Sun-City Slavutych disco club (right on the beach), open-air gym (Soviet era heritage) and riverboat excursions.

References

External links
 Official website
  Beach in Kyiv  - Selection of the best beaches in Kyiv

Beaches of Ukraine
Venetsiansky Island
Neighborhoods in Kyiv
Parks in Kyiv
Tourist attractions in Kyiv